Pseudolaguvia austrina is a species of catfish  from the Kunthipuzha River, which is aa tributary of the Bharathapuzha River which originates from the Western Ghats in Peninsular India.

References

Catfish of Asia
Fish of India
Taxa named by Kizhakke Veetil Radhakrishnan
Taxa named by Sivan Suresh Kumar
Taxa named by Heok Hee Ng
Fish described in 2011
Erethistidae